The 2004–05 NHL season was the National Hockey League's 88th season of operation. The entire 1,230-game schedule, that was set to begin in October, was officially canceled on February 16, 2005 due to an unresolved lockout that began on September 16, 2004. The loss of the 2004–05 season's games made the NHL the second North American professional sports league to lose an entire postseason of games because of a labor dispute, the first being the 1994–95 MLB strike, which occurred 10 years prior. It was the first time since 1919, when a Spanish flu pandemic canceled the finals, that the Stanley Cup was not awarded. This canceled season was later acknowledged with the words "2004–05 Season Not Played" engraved on the Cup.

According to the International Ice Hockey Federation, 388 NHL players were on teams overseas at some point during the season, spread across 19 European leagues. Many of these players had a contract clause to return to the NHL when the league started up again, even if it was during the current season.

Key rule changes which would dominate after the lockout were established as a result of a meeting between the NHL and its top minor league, the American Hockey League. On July 5, 2004, the AHL announced publicly the 2004–05 rule changes, many of which were passed as a result of the NHL's recommendation for experimentation.

Stanley Cup controversy 
As a result of the lockout, no Stanley Cup champion was crowned for the first time since the Spanish flu pandemic in 1919. This was controversial among many fans, who questioned whether the NHL had exclusive control over the Cup. A website known as freestanley.com (since closed) was launched, asking fans to write to the Cup trustees and urge them to return to the original pre-NHL Challenge Cup format. Adrienne Clarkson, then Governor General of Canada, alternately proposed that the Cup be presented to the top women's hockey team in lieu of the NHL season, but this idea was so unpopular with NHL fans, players, and officials that the Clarkson Cup was created instead. Meanwhile, a group in Ontario, also known as the "Wednesday Nighters", filed an application with the Ontario Superior Court, claiming that the Cup trustees had overstepped their bounds in signing the 1947 agreement with the NHL, and therefore must award the trophy to any team willing to play for the cup regardless of the lockout.

On February 7, 2006, a settlement was reached in which the trophy could be awarded to non-NHL teams in the event the league does not operate for a season, but the dispute lasted so long that, by the time it was settled, the NHL had resumed operating for the 2005–06 season, and the Stanley Cup went unclaimed for the 2004–05 season.

See also 
 NHL Collective Bargaining Agreement
 1994 World Series
 2020 NCAA Division I men's basketball tournament 
 2004 World Cup of Hockey
 2005 Men's World Ice Hockey Championships
 2004 in sports
 2005 in sports
 2012–13 NHL season
 1904 World Series

References

 
1
1
NHL